Vieau is a surname. Notable people with the surname include:

 Jacques Vieau (1757–1852), French-Canadian fur trader and settler
 Shane Vieau, Canadian set decorator